Helge Jørgensen (born 17 September 1937) was a Danish footballer.

During his club career he played for Odense KFUM. He earned 6 caps for the Denmark national football team, and was in the finals squad for the 1964 European Nations' Cup.

External links
Profile at DBU

1937 births
Danish men's footballers
Denmark international footballers
1964 European Nations' Cup players
Living people
Association football midfielders
Place of birth missing (living people)